Gregory Alexander Infante (born July 10, 1987) is a Venezuelan professional baseball pitcher who is currently a free agent. He previously played in Major League Baseball (MLB) for the Chicago White Sox.

Professional career

Chicago White Sox
Infante was signed by the Chicago White Sox as an international free agent in 2006. He was called up to the majors for the first time on September 1, 2010 and made his Major League debut in relief against the Detroit Tigers on September 7, 2010. In five games with the White Sox, he pitched 4 scoreless innings, allowing only 2 hits. Infante was released on August 30, 2012.

Los Angeles Dodgers
He signed with the Los Angeles Dodgers as a minor league free agent in November 2012 and was assigned to the Double-A Chattanooga Lookouts. He made 27 relief appearances with the Lookouts and was 1–1 with a 3.35 ERA. He was then promoted to Triple-A Albuquerque, where he made one appearance and allowed 3 runs in 2 innings. He was released on July 9, 2012.

Toronto Blue Jays
Infante signed a minor league deal with the Toronto Blue Jays in December 2013. He spent time with the Double-A New Hampshire Fisher Cats, and Triple-A Buffalo Bisons in 2014.

Infante signed another minor league deal with the Blue Jays on October 29, 2014, which included an invitation to spring training.

Philadelphia Phillies
On December 14, 2015, Infante signed a minor league contract with the Philadelphia Phillies with an invitation to spring training. He became a free agent after the 2016 season.

Chicago White Sox
Prior to the 2017 season, Infante signed a minor league deal to return to the Chicago White Sox. He made his return to the Major Leagues with the same club that he had debuted for that year and posted a 3.13 ERA with 49 strikeouts in 52 appearances. In 2018, he spent most of the year in Charlotte and posted an 8.00 ERA in 10 big league games. He elected free agency on November 3, 2018.

Baltimore Orioles
On January 7, 2019, Infante signed a minor league deal with the Baltimore Orioles. He was released on March 31, 2019.

Rieleros de Aguascalientes
On February 8, 2020, Infante signed with the Rieleros de Aguascalientes of the Mexican League. Infante did not play in a game in 2020 due to the cancellation of the Mexican League season because of the COVID-19 pandemic. On February 25, 2021, Infante was released.

See also

 List of Major League Baseball players from Venezuela

References

External links

1987 births
Living people
Albuquerque Isotopes players
Birmingham Barons players
Bristol Sox players
Bristol White Sox players
Buffalo Bisons (minor league) players
Charlotte Knights players
Chattanooga Lookouts players
Chicago White Sox players
Kannapolis Intimidators players
Major League Baseball pitchers
Major League Baseball players from Venezuela
New Hampshire Fisher Cats players
Tiburones de La Guaira players
Venezuelan expatriate baseball players in the United States
Venezuelan Summer League Orioles/White Sox players
Winston-Salem Dash players
World Baseball Classic players of Venezuela
2017 World Baseball Classic players